John B. Jones (1834–1881), Texas Ranger, Confederate soldier

John B. Jones may also refer to:

 John B. Jones (Texas politician), in Third Texas Legislature in 1849
John Bailey Jones (born 1927), American judge and South Dakota state representative

See also
John Jones (disambiguation)